Rustam Gasparyan (11 April 1961 – 17 October 2020) was an Armenian military officer and politician. In 2020 he was posthumously awarded the Hero of Artsakh military award.

Biography 
He was born on 11 April 1961 in Janfida village of Armavir Province. In 1996 he graduated from “Ararat” University of Armavir with a degree in law. In 1979 – 1981 he served in the Soviet Army. From 1989 he took part in the Artsakh freedom fighting. In 1994-2000 he served in the army of Armenia, occupying different commanding posts. On May 12, 2007 he was elected as a deputy of the National Assembly from the electoral district # 12. In 2017 he left politics and Prosperous Armenia party.

In 2020 Rustam Gasparyan's car was hit by an UAV used by the Azerbaijani Armed Forces during the 2020 Nagorno-Karabakh war, as a result of which his 29-year-old son died on the spot, and Rustam Gasparyan received multiple wounds to the head. On October 16, Rustam Gasparyan was operated in Stepanakert, then transferred to Goris MC, then to Erebuni MC. On October 17, it was reported that Rustam Gasparyan had died.

Awards and honours 
He was awarded the "Courage" Medal of Armenia, the "Courage" Medal of the Republic of Artsakh, as well as numerous Commemorative Medals of the Ministry of Defence of Armenia and Yerkrapah Voluntary Union. On 14 September 2011, he was awarded the Mkhitar Gosh Medal. On 25 December 2020, he was posthumously awarded the Hero of Artsakh, the highest title of the Republic of Artsakh, was awarded as well the "Golden Eagle" order. The mayor of Armavir city posthumously awarded Rustam Gasparyan with the title of Honorable Resident of Armavir.

Personal life  
He was married and had two children.

References 

Heroes of Artsakh
Armenian military personnel of the Nagorno-Karabakh War
Armenian military personnel of the 2020 Nagorno-Karabakh war
People killed in the 2020 Nagorno-Karabakh war
Deaths by drone strikes